Maximin Coia (born 5 December 1983) is a French former competitive pair skater. With Adeline Canac, he is the 2008 and 2009 French national champion.

Career 
Early in his pairs career, Coia competed on the junior circuit with Cyriane Felden. The pair placed 12th at the 2004 World Junior Championships.

In 2005, Coia began practicing one hour a day with singles skater Adeline Canac, who switched to pairs completely in July 2006. They were the 2008 French national champions, but were forced to miss the European Championships after she sustained a stress fracture in her sternum. They returned in time for the 2008 Worlds, where they placed 14th.

Canac / Coia moved to Canada for training in 2008. They again won the French national championships and were the highest placed French team at the 2009 Europeans, finishing ninth. They did not compete at that season's Worlds.

In the 2009–10 Olympic season, Canac / Coia finished second at the French Championships and 10th at the 2010 Europeans, three places behind the top French pair, Vanessa James / Yannick Bonheur. As a result, Canac / Coia were not selected to represent France at the 2010 Winter Olympics and at 2010 Worlds. They ended their partnership soon after.

Programs

With Canac

With Felden

Results

Pair skating with Canac

Pair skating with Felden

References

External links 

 
 

French male pair skaters
1983 births
Living people
Sportspeople from Aubervilliers